Golden Entertainment is an American gaming company based in Enterprise, Nevada that operates casinos, taverns and slot routes. It was formed in 2015 by the merger of Golden Gaming (founded in 2001 by Blake Sartini) and Lakes Entertainment. It is the largest tavern operator and largest slot route operator in Nevada. In October 2017, the company completed an $850 million acquisition of American Casino & Entertainment Properties. The company now has 10 casino resorts, nine in Southern Nevada and one in Maryland.

History
Golden Gaming was formed in October 2001 as a result of Blake L. Sartini's acquisition of Southwest Gaming Services, a company he founded before selling to Station Casinos.

In 2002, the Golden Tavern Group subsidiary was formed, and it acquired the PT's chain of taverns.

In 2004, the company acquired three casinos in Black Hawk, Colorado: the Golden Gates, Golden Gulch, and Golden Mardi Gras.

In 2006, Golden Gaming acquired the Pahrump Nugget Hotel & Gambling Hall from Generation 2000.

In February 2007, Golden began a two-year deal to operate the casino at the Hard Rock Hotel while its new owner, Morgans Hotel Group, applied for a gaming license. Golden paid $20.7 million a year to lease the casino, and received a $3.3 million monthly management fee, plus a portion of revenue. Golden pulled out of the deal early when Morgans received its gaming license in January 2008, citing a desire to focus on its other operations.

Golden Gaming agreed in November 2007 to buy the Saddle West casino in Pahrump from Anthony Marnell III and Sher Gaming, but canceled the deal the following June, deciding instead to focus on the Pahrump Nugget, where it began an $11 million expansion and remodeling.

In 2010, Golden Gaming agreed to take over operation of four small casinos owned by The Siegel Group, previously operated by United Coin: the Gold Spike, Siegel Slots and Suites, the Resort on Mount Charleston, and Rumor.

In March 2012, Golden bought from Affinity Gaming the Terrible's Town Casino and Terrible's Lakeside Casino & RV Park in Pahrump and Affinity's slot route operation (except for Terrible Herbst locations).  The deal made Golden the largest employer and largest gaming operator in Nye County, and the largest slot route operator in Nevada, with about 8,500 machines in 650 locations, making up 45% of the market.  Affinity in turn bought Golden's three casinos in Black Hawk, which were valued at a total of $76–92 million.

Golden Gaming agreed in January 2015 to merge with Lakes Entertainment. Sartini would own 35% of the company and serve as its chief executive officer. The merger was completed on August 3, 2015, establishing Golden Entertainment.

The company expanded into Montana in 2016, purchasing slot routes with 2,800 machines for a total of $45 million. In June 2017, Golden Entertainment was granted a license for slot route operations in Illinois. This marked the fourth state Golden is licensed.

In October 2017, Golden Entertainment acquired American Casino & Entertainment Properties for $850 million, which expanded the company's casino portfolio by four: the Stratosphere, Arizona Charlie's Boulder, Arizona Charlie's Decatur and the Aquarius Casino Resort. The following year, the company announced a $140 million renovation of the Stratosphere.

In January 2019, the company bought the Colorado Belle and Edgewater casinos in Laughlin, Nevada from Marnell Gaming (owner and operator of Nugget Casino Resort in Sparks) for $190 million. The acquisition of the Colorado Belle and Edgewater gives the company dominance in the market with three of 11 Laughlin properties, including the Aquarius.

Divisions

Golden Casino Group

 Aquarius Casino Resort — Laughlin, Nevada
 Arizona Charlie's Boulder — Las Vegas, Nevada
 Arizona Charlie's Decatur — Las Vegas, Nevada
 Edgewater Hotel and Casino — Laughlin, Nevada
 Gold Town Casino — Pahrump, Nevada
 Lakeside Hotel & Casino — Pahrump, Nevada
 Pahrump Nugget Hotel & Gambling Hall — Pahrump, Nevada
 Rocky Gap Resort Casino — Flintstone, Maryland
 The Strat Hotel, Casino and Skypod — Las Vegas, Nevada

Golden Route Operations
Slot route operator with over 9000 machines in Nevada and more than 2,800 games in Montana

PT's Entertainment Group
 PT's Gold
 Henderson (3 locations)
 Las Vegas (15 locations)
 PT's Ranch
 Las Vegas (2 locations)
 PT's Pub
 Henderson (5 locations)
 Las Vegas (17 locations)
 PT's Brewing Co
 Las Vegas
 Sean Patrick's
 Las Vegas (3 locations)
 North Las Vegas (1 location)
 Sierra Gold
 Henderson (1 location)
 Las Vegas (3 locations)
 North Las Vegas (1 location)
 Reno (1 location)
 SG Bar
 Las Vegas

Former
 Colorado Belle — Laughlin, Nevada
 Golden Gates Casino — Black Hawk, Colorado
 Golden Gulch Casino — Black Hawk, Colorado
 Golden Mardi Gras Casino — Black Hawk, Colorado

References

External links
 

 
2015 establishments in Nevada
American companies established in 2015
Companies based in Enterprise, Nevada
Companies listed on the Nasdaq
Entertainment companies established in 2015
Gambling companies of the United States
Hospitality companies established in 2015